Robert Caldwell (March 7, 1866 – August 29, 1950) was an American farmer, businessman, and politician.

Early life 
Born in the town of Arlington, Columbia County, Wisconsin, Caldwell was a farmer in Lodi, Wisconsin.

Career 
Caldwell was the president of the Columbia Bank of Lodi and the Lodi Union Agricultural Society. He served on the Lodi Board of Education, the Columbia County Board of Supervisors, and was the president of the village of Lodi. He served on the local draft board during World War I and World War II. Caldwell was active in the Republican and was a presidential elector in the 1928 United States presidential election. In 1915, 1921, 1923, and 1925, Caldwell served in the Wisconsin State Assembly. He then served in the Wisconsin Senate from 1927 to 1931.

Personal life 
In 1931, Caldwell and his wife moved to Madison, Wisconsin. Caldwell died in a hospital in Madison, Wisconsin, after an illness of few months.

References

1866 births
1950 deaths
People from Arlington, Wisconsin
Politicians from Madison, Wisconsin
Businesspeople from Madison, Wisconsin
Farmers from Wisconsin
School board members in Wisconsin
County supervisors in Wisconsin
Mayors of places in Wisconsin
Republican Party members of the Wisconsin State Assembly
Republican Party Wisconsin state senators
People from Lodi, Wisconsin